is a Japanese politician of the Liberal Democratic Party, a member of the House of Representatives in the Diet (national legislature). Moriyama was the Minister of Agriculture, Forestry and Fisheries from October 2015 to August 2016.

Overview 
A native of Kanoya, Kagoshima and high school graduate, he was elected to the first of his seven terms in the city assembly of Kagoshima in 1975.  He was elected to the House of Councilors in 1998, and then to the House of Representatives in 2004.  He was one of the 33 postal rebels in the 2005 election, but easily defended his seat against an LDP challenger.

He served as the 59th Minister of Agriculture, Forestry and Fisheries from 7 October 2015 through 3 August 2016.

References

External links 
 Official website in Japanese.

1945 births
Living people
Politicians from Kagoshima Prefecture
People from Kanoya, Kagoshima
Members of the House of Councillors (Japan)
Members of the House of Representatives (Japan)
Liberal Democratic Party (Japan) politicians
Ministers of Agriculture, Forestry and Fisheries of Japan
21st-century Japanese politicians